Game On! is an American sports-based comedy game show that aired on CBS from May 27 to July 22, 2020. It is hosted by Keegan-Michael Key and stars tennis player Venus Williams and American football player Rob Gronkowski with comedians Bobby Lee and Ian Karmel as they captain two teams of three competitors competing in a series of challenges.

The show is an American adaptation of the British series A League of Their Own. It is executive produced by James Corden, who has served as a host of the British version.

Episodes and ratings

References

External links

2020 American television series debuts
2020 American television series endings
2020s American comedy game shows
American sports television series
American television series based on British television series
CBS original programming
English-language television shows
American panel games
Television series by CBS Studios